Pope Lucius may refer to:

 Pope Lucius I (c 200–254), 22nd Catholic pope
 Pope Lucius II (died 1145), 166th Catholic pope
 Pope Lucius III (c 1100–1185), 171st Catholic pope

See also 
 List of popes

Lucius